Enner Remberto Valencia Lastra (born 4 November 1989) is an Ecuadorian professional footballer who plays as a forward for Süper Lig club Fenerbahçe and captains the Ecuador national team.

He previously played for Emelec in Ecuador, where he won the 2013 Ecuadorian Serie A and was awarded the Copa Sudamericana Golden Boot in 2013. Valencia also played for Pachuca in Mexico, being awarded the Liga MX Golden Boot in the 2014 Clausura tournament. He joined English club West Ham United for an estimated £12 million in July 2014. In August 2016, Valencia went out on loan to Everton for the season, before being sold to Mexican club Tigres UANL in July 2017. At Tigres, he won Liga MX's 2017 Apertura and 2019 Clausura tournaments, and finished runner-up in the 2019 CONCACAF Champions League, winning the latter competition's Golden Boot. In August 2020, Valencia signed for Fenerbahçe in Turkey.

At the international level, Valencia has earned over 70 caps for Ecuador since his debut in 2012. He represented the nation at the FIFA World Cup in 2014 and 2022, and the Copa América in 2015, 2016, 2019 and 2021. With 38 goals, Valencia is Ecuador's all-time top goalscorer, and holds the record for the most goals scored in the World Cup for Ecuador, with six.

Club career

Emelec
Valencia came to Guayaquil to trial for Emelec in 2008 from Caribe Junior's youth system, the same team where Ecuador star Antonio Valencia played in his early years. In 2008, he was transferred to Emelec. From 2008 to early 2010 he received no opportunities in the first team, but with the arrival of the Argentinian coach Jorge Sampaoli, Valencia started to receive playtime opportunities. Emelec were runners-up to champions LDU Quito, losing 2–1 on aggregate score.

Valencia scored nine league goals in 30 league matches in 2011. In November 2012, he scored five goals in five separate matches against El Nacional, LDU Loja, Técnico Universitario, and twice against Manta in both home and away matches, winning four of the five matches, only drawing against LDU Loja. This brought his goal tally to 13 goals scored in 40 league matches played, his best season yet, but for a third season in a row, the team was runner-up to league champions and club rivals Barcelona SC.

On 7 August 2013, Valencia scored his first career hat-trick against Peruvian side Sport Huancayo, in a 4–0 2013 Copa Sudamericana first round match. He finished the season as league champions with Emelec, the club's first since 2002.

Pachuca
After numerous rumours involving the interest of Liga MX side Pachuca for Valencia, both parties came to terms and agreed on a transfer.

On 18 January 2014, Valencia scored his first goal in a 2–1 victory against Tijuana. The following week he scored two goals to in Pachuca's first away win league match against league champions Club León. He finished the regular season as the top goal-scorer with 12 goals, scoring various braces for Pachuca. Valencia scored his first hat-trick against UNAM in a 2–4 away win to advance in the 2014 Liga MX Clausura play-offs.

West Ham United

2014–15

On 29 July 2014, Premier League club West Ham United completed the transfer of Valencia, on a five-year contract for a fee estimated at £12 million. He later confirmed that he knew little about West Ham before signing and that he mainly knew of them having watched hooligan films such as the 2005 release of Green Street starring Elijah Wood. Valencia made his West Ham debut on 16 August 2014 in a 1–0 home defeat to Tottenham Hotspur coming on as an 81st-minute substitute for Carlton Cole. On 27 August, he had his penalty saved by Mark Howard as West Ham were knocked out at home in the second round of the League Cup by Sheffield United.
Valencia's first goal for West Ham came in his full league debut, against Hull City on 15 September 2014, in a 2–2 draw. Valencia went on to score two more goals for West Ham in the following weeks, including a header in a 3–1 away win at Burnley, and a goal in a 2–2 draw with Stoke City.

2015–16
His first match of his second season was on 30 July 2015 in the UEFA Europa League third qualifying round first leg at home against Astra Giurgiu; he headed West Ham into the lead but was one of two players substituted through injury in the first half as the team eventually drew 2–2. It was confirmed that he had suffered "significant" injuries to his right knee and ankle, and was ruled out for twelve weeks. Valencia scored his first league goals of the 2015–16 season with two in a 3–1 comeback win against AFC Bournemouth on 12 January 2016, including a powerfully hit free-kick.

Loan to Everton
On 31 August 2016, Valencia signed for Everton on a season-long loan, with the option of a permanent £14.5 million move in the summer of 2017. Valencia scored his first league goal for Everton when he fired home from close range in a 3–0 win against Southampton on 2 January 2017.

Tigres UANL
On 13 July 2017, Valencia signed for Tigres UANL for a fee of 4.2 million.

Fenerbahçe

2020–21 season
On 28 August 2020, Valencia signed for Süper Lig club Fenerbahçe on a free transfer. In his first year with the team, he scored 12 goals in 34 matches of 2020–21 Süper Lig.

2021–22 season
On 26 August 2021, he made his first hat-trick with the team against HJK Helsinki in 2021–22 UEFA Europa League season and Fenerbahçe won the game 5-2 He scored 13 goals in all competitives of 33 matches.

2022–23 season
He made a very strong start to the 2022–23 season with coach Jorge Jesus and scored double goals against Ümraniyespor, Kasımpaşa and Adana Demirspor in his first three matches of the season. On 15 January 2023, he also scored double goals against Gaziantep.

On 9 October 2022, he made his first league match hat-trick against Karagümrük in 2022–23 Süper Lig season and Fenerbahçe won the match 5-4 and on 29 January 2023, he scored 4 goals against Kasımpaşa and helped Fenerbahçe for 5-1 victory.

International career

After playing for the nation's under-22 team at the 2011 Pan American Games, Valencia made his debut for Ecuador on 12 February 2012 in a friendly against Honduras.

Valencia initially began his career as a winger, but was converted to play as a striker by Emelec coach Gustavo Quinteros. Reinaldo Rueda started experimenting with Valencia as a striker after the untimely death of Christian Benítez. After making three appearances in the 2014 FIFA World Cup qualification campaign, he scored his first international goal in a 2–2 draw against Honduras on 19 November 2013. He continued his good form in 2014, scoring in three of Ecuador's four pre-tournament friendlies. On 5 March, he scored, assisted a goal and won a penalty kick as La Tri came from 3–0 down to defeat Australia 4–3. He then scored the team's only goal in a 3–1 loss against Mexico, and gave them an early lead in a 2–2 draw with England in Miami.

In June 2014, Valencia was named in Ecuador's squad for the 2014 FIFA World Cup. On 15 June, he made his FIFA World Cup debut in the team's opening match against Switzerland at the Estádio Nacional Mané Garrincha in Brasília, opening the scoring with a header in a 2–1 defeat. In Ecuador's second match, Valencia scored both goals to defeat Honduras 2–1 in Curitiba. He continued his good form after the FIFA World Cup, scoring the third goal of a 4–0 victory against Bolivia. On 10 October, Valencia again netted for Ecuador in the 88th minute over the United States, which ended in a 1–1 draw. His swerving, right-footed shot took a right turn on its way towards the goal, making it impossible for goalkeeper Brad Guzan to stop.

In Ecuador's second group match at the 2015 Copa América in Chile, Valencia successfully converted a penalty to Bolivia, but the kick had to be taken again due to an opponent's infringement; the re-take was saved by Romel Quiñónez. He later scored from close range, but Ecuador lost 2–3 nonetheless. Four days later in Rancagua, Valencia set up Miller Bolaños' opener and scored Ecuador's second goal as they won 2–1 against Mexico, eliminating the opponents.

On 8 October 2021, in a 2022 World Cup qualification match against Bolivia, Valencia scored his 32nd and 33rd international goals, becoming the Ecuador national team's all time top goal scorer.

In the opening game of the 2022 FIFA World Cup, Valencia scored the first goal of the tournemant with a penalty. Valencia scored both of Ecuador's goals in the same match, their 2–0 win over tournament hosts Qatar in the opening match at the 2022 World Cup. In doing so, he became Ecuador's record goalscorer at World Cup final tournaments, with five goals. On 25 November 2022, Valencia scored in a 1–1 tie against the Netherlands, thus becoming the first South American player to score six consecutive times in the World Cup.

Personal life
Valencia hails from Esmeraldas Province and is of Afro-Ecuadorian descent. He came from a poor family and when he arrived at Emelec, he had to sleep in rudimentary lodgings at the club's Estadio George Capwell, as he had no money to stay anywhere else and at times struggled to buy enough to eat. In October 2016, a warrant was issued for his arrest in Ecuador for unpaid child support. In August 2020, Valencia's sister, Erci was taken hostage in San Lorenzo by an armed gang and held for 10 days before being released unharmed.

Career statistics

Club

International

Ecuador score listed first, score column indicates score after each Valencia goal

Honours
Emelec
Ecuadorian Serie A: 2013

Tigres UANL
Liga MX: Apertura 2017, Clausura 2019
Campeones Cup: 2018

Individual
Serie A Best Player: 2013
Copa Sudamericana top scorer: 2013
Liga MX top scorer: Clausura 2014
Liga MX Best XI: Apertura 2017
CONCACAF Champions League Golden Boot: 2019
CONCACAF Champions League Team of the Tournament: 2019

See also 
 List of top international men's football goal scorers by country

References

External links

Profile at the Fenerbahçe S.K. website

1989 births
Living people
People from San Lorenzo Canton
Ecuadorian footballers
Association football wingers
Association football forwards
C.S. Emelec footballers
C.F. Pachuca players
West Ham United F.C. players
Everton F.C. players
Tigres UANL footballers
Fenerbahçe S.K. footballers
Ecuadorian Serie A players
Liga MX players
Premier League players
Süper Lig players
Ecuador international footballers
Footballers at the 2011 Pan American Games
2014 FIFA World Cup players
2015 Copa América players
Copa América Centenario players
2019 Copa América players
2021 Copa América players
2022 FIFA World Cup players
Pan American Games competitors for Ecuador
Ecuadorian expatriate footballers
Expatriate footballers in England
Expatriate footballers in Mexico
Expatriate footballers in Turkey
Ecuadorian expatriate sportspeople in England
Ecuadorian expatriate sportspeople in Mexico
Ecuadorian expatriate sportspeople in Turkey